Kansas City Airport may refer to airports in the Kansas City metro area.
Kansas City International Airport (IATA: MCI)
Charles B. Wheeler Downtown Airport (IATA: MKC)